Watch Hill is a small hill lying on the western fringe of the Lake District in England, north east of Whitehaven. It should not be confused with another Watch Hill some 19 km to the north-east, near Cockermouth, which is classified as a Marilyn and is one of Wainwright's Outlying Fells.

Fells of the Lake District